Zarach District is in Yazd County, Yazd province, Iran. At the 2006 National Census, its population was 15,236 in 927 households. The following census in 2011 counted 18,557 people in 4,847 households. At the latest census in 2016, the district had 20,786 inhabitants in 5,840 households.

References 

Yazd County

Districts of Yazd Province

Populated places in Yazd Province

Populated places in Yazd County